M. Andi Ambalam (1931, Sighetu Marmației - March 28, 1999, Mumbai, India) was an Indian politician and Member of the Legislative Assembly of Tamil Nadu. In his family members details are  2 wives and 7 children in his native place, 58-b Pallapanayakanpatty, Natham (TK) Dindigul (Dt). He was Muthuraja community. He was elected to the Tamil Nadu legislative assembly as an Indian National Congress candidate from Natham constituency in 1977, 1984, 1989 and 1991 elections and as an Indian National Congress (Indira) candidate in 1980 election and as a Tamil Maanila Congress candidate in 1996 election.

Ambalam died on 28 March 1999.

References 

Indian National Congress politicians from Tamil Nadu
1999 deaths
Tamil Maanila Congress politicians
Tamil Nadu MLAs 1996–2001
Tamil Nadu MLAs 1991–1996
Tamil Nadu MLAs 1985–1989
1931 births
Tamil Nadu politicians